Berlencourt-le-Cauroy is a commune in the Pas-de-Calais department in the Hauts-de-France region in northern France.

Geography
A village located 16 miles (26 km) west of Arras on the D79 road, in the valley of the river Canche.

Population

Sights
 Vestiges of a 13th-century château.
 The Château du Cauroy, built in 1680.
 The eighteenth century Château of Ignaucourt.
 The church of Saint-Sulpice, dating from the seventeenth century.
 The church of Saint-Pierre, dating from the nineteenth century.

See also
Communes of the Pas-de-Calais department

References

Communes of Pas-de-Calais